Lasanthi Madushani (born 12 September 1987) is a Sri Lankan cricketer who plays for Sri Lanka's women's cricket team. She made her One Day International (ODI) debut against the Netherlands on 7 October 2010.

References

External links
 

1987 births
Living people
Sri Lankan women cricketers
Sri Lanka women One Day International cricketers
Sri Lanka women Twenty20 International cricketers
Cricketers from Colombo
Asian Games medalists in cricket
Cricketers at the 2014 Asian Games
Asian Games bronze medalists for Sri Lanka
Medalists at the 2014 Asian Games